If I Were a Spy is a 1967 French crime film directed by Bertrand Blier, starring Bernard Blier and Bruno Cremer. It tells the story of a medical doctor who gets into trouble when one of his patients turns out to be hunted by the mafia. Filming took place from 15 November to 18 December 1966. The film was released in France in August 1967.

Cast 

 Bernard Blier as Doctor Lefèvre
 Bruno Cremer as Matras
 Suzanne Flon as Geneviève Laurent
 Claude Piéplu as Monteil
 Patricia Scott as Sylvie
 Pierre Le Rumeur as Kruger
 Francis Lax as Rodard
 Jacques Sempey as a man
Jean-François Rémi as Jean-François Rémy

References

External links 
 

1967 films
French crime comedy films
Films directed by Bertrand Blier
1960s crime comedy films
1960s French-language films
French black-and-white films
Films scored by Serge Gainsbourg
1967 comedy films
1960s French films